is a Japanese sport shooter who competed in the 1988 Summer Olympics.

References

1962 births
Living people
Japanese female sport shooters
ISSF pistol shooters
Olympic shooters of Japan
Shooters at the 1988 Summer Olympics
20th-century Japanese women